Philippine mahogany is a common name for several different species of trees and their wood.

 Botanically, the name refers to Toona calantas in the mahogany family, Meliaceae. It is endemic to the Philippines.
 In the US timber trade, it is often applied to wood of the genus Shorea in the family Dipterocarpaceae. 
 Rarely, it may also refer to the narra tree (Pterocarpus indicus) in the legume family, Fabaceae.

References